Haplochromis artaxerxes was a species of cichlid endemic to Lake Victoria where it is only known from the Napoleon Gulf, in Uganda.  This species can reach a length of  SL. The specific name uses the name of Artaxerxes I of Persia who was known as "long-handed", a reference to this species extremely long pectoral fins.

References

artaxerxes
Endemic freshwater fish of Uganda
Fish of Lake Victoria
Fish described in 1962
Taxa named by Humphry Greenwood
Taxonomy articles created by Polbot